Aleksander Leon Richard Kapp (6 July 1874 Suure-Jaani Parish (now Põhja-Sakala Parish), Kreis Fellin – 9 September 1940 Tallinn) was an Estonian politician. He was a member of Estonian Constituent Assembly. He was a member of the assembly since 30 July 1919. He replaced Johan Kõpp.

References

1874 births
1940 deaths
People from Põhja-Sakala Parish
People from Kreis Fellin
Estonian Lutheran clergy
Christian People's Party (Estonia) politicians
National Centre Party (Estonia) politicians
Members of the Estonian Constituent Assembly
Members of the Riigikogu, 1929–1932
Members of the Riigikogu, 1932–1934